Samu Markkula (born February 27, 1994) is a Finnish professional ice hockey player. He is currently playing for JYP Jyväskylä of the SM-liiga.

Markkula made his SM-liiga debut playing with JYP Jyväskylä during the 2012–13 SM-liiga season.

References

External links

1994 births
Living people
Finnish ice hockey left wingers
JYP Jyväskylä players
Sportspeople from Jyväskylä
21st-century Finnish people